The Sebkha de Ndrhamcha is a large salt pan in Mauritania that is about  in diameter and the lowest point in Mauritania. The Atlantic Ocean borders it to the west, and the Sahara Desert lies directly to its east.

Landforms of Mauritania
Salt flats